Billy Walsh may refer to:

Billy Walsh (Australian footballer) (1911–1986), Australian rules footballer
Billy Walsh (boxer) (born 1963), Irish boxer
Billy Walsh (curler) (1917–1971), Canadian curler
Billy Walsh (footballer, born 1921) (1921–2006), Irish footballer
Billy Walsh (polo) (1907–1992), Irish polo player
Billy Walsh (soccer, born 1972), American soccer player and coach

Fictional 
Billy Walsh (Entourage), a character on U.S. TV series Entourage, portrayed by Rhys Coiro
Billy Walsh (Third Watch), a character on U.S. TV series Third Watch, portrayed by Bill Walsh

See also
 William Walsh (disambiguation)
 Bill Walsh (disambiguation)